Tomasini is an Italian surname. Notable people with the surname include:

Doris Tomasini (born 1984), Italian sprinter
Emilio Tomasini
Ernesto Tomasini (born 1968), Italian actor, singer and writer
George Tomasini (1909–1964), American film editor
Giacomo Filippo Tomasini
Jeanne Tomasini (1920–2022), Corsican writer
Luigi Tomasini (1741–1808), Italian violinist
Stefano Tomasini (born 1963), Italian cyclist

See also
Tomasin
Tommasini

Italian-language surnames
Patronymic surnames
Surnames from given names